Galeocerdo is a genus of requiem sharks that have lived since the Paleocene epoch. While these sharks were formerly diverse, only  G. cuvier (the modern tiger shark) survives today.

Species 
Species in the genus Galeocerdo include:
 †Galeocerdo aduncus
 †Galeocerdo alabamensis
 †Galeocerdo clarkensis
 Galeocerdo cuvier
 †Galeocerdo denticulatus
 †Galeocerdo eaglesomi
 †Galeocerdo gibberulus
 †Galeocerdo latidens
 †Galeocerdo mayumbensis
 †Galeocerdo minor
 †Galeocerdo mixtus
 †Galeocerdo productus

References 

 
Shark genera
Taxa named by Johannes Peter Müller
Taxa named by Friedrich Gustav Jakob Henle
Fish genera with one living species